Melica aristata is a species of grass known by the common names awned melic and bearded melicgrass.

Distribution
It is native to the western United States from the Pacific Northwest to the Sierra Nevada and nearby ranges, where it grows in mountain forests and open hillsides.

Description
The inflorescence is a narrow series of cylindrical spikelets. Each spikelet has an awn up to 1.2 centimeters long, the characteristic which distinguishes it from the other melics.

References

External links
Jepson Manual Treatment - Melica aristata

aristata
Grasses of the United States
Native grasses of California
Flora of the West Coast of the United States
Flora of British Columbia
Flora of Oregon
Flora of the Sierra Nevada (United States)
Natural history of the California Coast Ranges
Flora without expected TNC conservation status